Vizura Sport Center is an indoor sports arena in Belgrade, Serbia.

Built in 2002 and located in the New Belgrade municipality on Tošin Bunar Street, it has a seating capacity for 1,500. The arena is licensed for professional basketball, volleyball and table tennis. It is the home arena of basketball clubs KK Mega Vizura.

See also
 List of indoor arenas in Serbia

References

External links
 Vizura Hall 

2002 establishments in Serbia
Sports venues completed in 2002
Indoor arenas in Serbia
Basketball venues in Serbia
Entertainment venues in Belgrade
KK Mega Basket home arenas
New Belgrade
Sports venues in Belgrade